Tram is a 2012 Czech short animated film directed by Michaela Pavlátová about the conductress of a tram and her sexual fantasies on it.

The film premiered at the 2012 Cannes Film Festival. It won the Annecy Cristal in 2012.

References

External links
 

2012 animated films
2012 films
Czech animated films
2010s animated short films
Animated films about trains